Navbahor may refer to:

Tajikistan
 Navbahor, Khatlon, a town in Bokhtar District, Khatlon Region
 Navbahor, Sughd, in Mastchoh District, Sughd Region

Uzbekistan
 Navbahor District in Navoiy Region
 Navbahor, Fergana Region, a town in Furqat District, Fergana Region
 Navbahor, Namangan, a town in Namangan District, Namangan Region
 Navbahor, Pop, a town in Pop District, Namangan Region
 PFC Navbahor Namangan, an association football club in Namangan